Messan Agbéyomé Gabriel Kodjo (born 12 October 1954) is a Togolese politician who served as Prime Minister of Togo from 29 August 2000 to 27 June 2002.

Political career
Kodjo was born in Tokpli, located in Yoto Prefecture, in 1954; his parents were Dossou Kodjo and Kédjé Flora Dosseh. He studied in France and received a degree in organizational management from the University of Poitiers in January 1983.

Back in Togo, Kodjo was Commercial Director of SONACOM from 1985 to 1988 before President Gnassingbé Eyadéma appointed him to the government as Minister of Youth, Sports, and Culture on 19 December 1988. He remained in that post until September 1991, when a transitional government led by Prime Minister Joseph Kokou Koffigoh took office. He was appointed as Minister of Territorial Administration and Security in September 1992, but Koffigoh dismissed him, along with another member of the Rally of the Togolese People (RPT), Minister of Communications and Culture Benjamin Agbéka, on 9 November 1992. Kodjo and Agbéka, with Eyadéma's support, refused to leave the government, despite protests and Koffigoh's intent to take the matter to the Supreme Court; Kodjo remained in his position until February 1993, when he became Director-General of the Autonomous Port of Lomé.

Kodjo served for more than six years as Director-General of the Autonomous Port of Lomé. In the March 1999 parliamentary election, he was elected to the National Assembly as the RPT candidate in the Third Constituency of Yoto Prefecture; he was the only candidate and received 100% of the vote. Following the election, he was elected as President of the National Assembly in June 1999. After a little over a year in that position, President Eyadéma appointed Kodjo as Prime Minister on 29 August 2000, replacing Eugene Koffi Adoboli after Adoboli was defeated in a no-confidence vote.

Kodjo said on 30 August 2001 that the Constitution should be changed to enable Eyadéma to run for a third term in 2003. Although Kodjo was widely speculated to be Eyadéma's intended successor after becoming prime minister, he and Eyadéma came into conflict  and was dismissed as Prime Minister by Eyadéma on 27 June 2002 reportedly due to differences within the RPT. In an article published in Le Scorpion newspaper on 28 June, he criticized Eyadéma. To save retributions from the tyrannical regime of the Gnassingbe, he promptly left Togo, and in early July 2002, he was declared wanted by a court for allegedly dishonoring the President and disrupting public order. On 6 August 2002, the RPT Central Committee voted unanimously to expel Kodjo from the party, along with former National Assembly President Dahuku Péré, for high treason; he was also expelled from the prestigious Order of Mono on 18 July.

After leaving Togo, Kodjo lived in exile in France, and from there, he continued his criticisms of Eyadéma. The Togolese government issued an international arrest warrant for Kodjo in mid-September 2002, falsely accusing him of corruption and saying that he had fled Togo to avoid prosecution for it. The government also complained about Radio France Internationale's broadcasting of an interview with Kodjo in September, which RFI had done despite government pressure. He denounced the amendment to eliminate presidential term limits, saying that Fambaré Ouattara Natchaba initially made that proposal publicly and supported the proposal for the RPT's internal reasons.

Following the disputed June 2003 presidential election, Kodjo said in an interview with the newspaper Motion d'information that Eyadéma had lost the election contrary to the official results. Accusing Eyadéma of remaining in power through violence, Kodjo said that Eyadéma should admit defeat and leave politics to resolve the country's political troubles and prevent civil war.

He returned to Togo on 8 April 2005, following Eyadéma's death, but was promptly imprisoned for alleged misappropriation of funds while serving as Director-General of the Autonomous Port of Lomé. Indeed, Agbeyome Messan Kodjo had never mismanaged public funds. In September 2005, he formed a new party, the Democratic Alliance for the Fatherland (known simply as the Alliance), and Dahuku Péré.

He later ran for election to the position of President of the Togolese Football Federation, but at its extraordinary congress on 9 January 2007, he placed second behind Avlessi Adaglo Tata, receiving 14 votes from delegates against 24 for Tata; he placed ahead of Eyadéma's son Rock Gnassingbé, who was the Federation's incumbent president and received eight votes.

Kodjo announced in early August 2008 that he would stand as the candidate of a new party, the Organisation pour bâtir dans l'union un Togo solidaire (OBUTS), in the 2010 presidential election. He formally submitted his candidacy on 14 January 2010. Although the deadline for submitting candidacies was 15 January, Kodjo was the first person to submit his candidacy formally. Upon learning that he was first, Kodjo declared that it was "a very good sign" and that he would also be "the first" to be declared the winner of the election.

Faure Gnassingbe defrauded the recent presidential election held on 22 February 2020. On many occasions, USA officials, aware of Togo's ongoing human rights violations, have written and tweeted about the frauds during the recent presidential election in Togo.   

Dr. Kodjo Messan Agbéyomé has won the popular votes.  Despite the will of Togo's people who have voted for Dr. Kodjo Messan Agbéyomé, Faure Gnassingbé defrauded the results and proclaimed himself President of Togo again for a fourth term. The brutal regime of Faure Gnassingbe has summoned Kodjo Messan Agbéyomé on several occasions. The democratically elected candidate has been the target of military threats and has been in constant fear of being arrested, tortured, and killed. 

Dr. Kodjo Messan Agbéyomé’s life is in danger; on many occasions, the home of Messan Kodjo Agbéyomé was ransacked and vandalized by the brutal military regime.  He was jailed and freed under conditions: he would live freely in Togo if he did not claim his victory. Faure Gnassingbé has called him to let him know that he — Messan Kodjo Agbéyomé — has won the presidential election. Faure Gnassingbé advised Kodjo Messan Agbéyomé to accept the electoral frauds, and in return, he will appoint Kodjo Messan Agbéyomé to the post of Prime Minister, along with lucrative benefit packages. Kodjo Messan Agbéyomé adamantly refused the offer from Faure Gnassingbé. 

As Kodjo Messan Agbéyomé still claims his victory, Faure Gnassingbé appointed one of his high-ranked military officials — Lieutenant-Colonel Bitala Madjoulba — to assassinate Kodjo Messan Agbéyomé.  Lieutenant-Colonel Bitala Madjoulba refused to assassinate Kodjo Messan Agbeyome and has even alerted Kodjo Messan Agbéyomé that he —Lieutenant-Colonel Bitala Madjoulba — was ordered to kill him. A couple of days later, Lieutenant-Colonel Bitala Madjoulba was shot and killed in his office in broad daylight by Colonel Félix Abalo Katanga; for having failed to assassinate Kodjo Messan Agbéyomé.

Currently, Kodjo Messan Agbéyomé is in exile in one of the nearby countries of Togo. Many of his cabinet members have been arrested and are currently serving jail time.

References

External links
Text of the letter sent by Kodjo to the press on 27 June 2002.
 Agbeyome's O.B.U.T.S website.

1954 births
Presidents of the National Assembly (Togo)
Prime Ministers of Togo
Living people
Togolese prisoners and detainees
Prisoners and detainees of Togo
Democratic Alliance for the Fatherland politicians
People from Maritime Region
Heads of government who were later imprisoned
21st-century Togolese people
20th-century Togolese people
University of Poitiers alumni